John Fife (1940- ) is a human rights activist and retired Presbyterian minister who lives in Tucson, Arizona. He was a member of the Sanctuary Movement and was a co-founder of the immigrant rights group No More Deaths.

Rev. Fife served as a minister for 35 years at Southside Presbyterian Church in Tucson, a church with a strong focus on social justice issues.  In 1992 Fife was elected Moderator of the General Assembly of the Presbyterian Church (USA). He is now Pastor Emeritus at Southside Presbyterian.

In the 1980s John Fife co-founded the Sanctuary Movement in the United States. Volunteers in the movement  provided support to Central American refugees, many of whom were fleeing U.S.-supported death squads in their home countries of El Salvador and Guatemala. The movement organized over 500 churches to help the refugees cross the border and find sanctuary in the U.S., in defiance of federal law. In 1986 Fife was convicted, along with seven other people, of violating federal immigration laws and served five years probation.

In 2004 a group of religious leaders in Tucson formed a coalition called No More Deaths to attempt to end the deaths of immigrants along the United States-Mexico border. John Fife was among the leaders of that effort and continues to work closely with No More Deaths.

References

External links
Reverend John Fife: A Call for Sanctuary

Human migration
Immigration to the United States
Leaders of Christian parachurch organizations
American Presbyterian ministers
Presbyterian Church (USA) teaching elders
Living people
Year of birth missing (living people)